This is a list of banks in Yemen.

Central bank 
 Central Bank of Yemen

Local banks 
 National Bank of Yemen
 Tadhamon International Islamic Bank
 Yemen Commercial Bank

See also 
 List of banks in the Arab world

Yemen
Banks
Banks

Yemen